This is a list of equipment used by the Hungarian Ground Forces.

Infantry weapons

Firearms

Explosives

Vehicles

River fleet

Possible future purchases

References

Military equipment of Hungary
Hungary
Equipment